Diego Hernandez (born February 23, 2005) is a soccer player who plays as a midfielder for North Texas SC in USL League One via the FC Dallas academy.

References

External links
 
 Diego Hernandez at FC Dallas

2005 births
Living people
American soccer players
Association football midfielders
North Texas SC players
USL League One players
Soccer players from Dallas